Facundo Martin Argüello (born 23 February 1979 in Buenos Aires) is an Argentine footballer who currently plays for Club Atlético Nueva Chicago.

External links
 Statistics at FutbolXXI.com  
 BDFA profile 

1979 births
Living people
Footballers from Buenos Aires
Argentine expatriate footballers
Argentine footballers
Association football defenders
Primera Nacional players
Categoría Primera A players
Nueva Chicago footballers
Atlético de Rafaela footballers
Instituto footballers
Club Atlético Huracán footballers
Millonarios F.C. players
Hapoel Petah Tikva F.C. players
Expatriate footballers in Colombia
Expatriate footballers in Israel
Argentine expatriate sportspeople in Israel
Expatriate footballers in Romania
Expatriate footballers in Malaysia